José Oyarzabal (born 13 February 1970) is a French international rower.  

He won a silver medal in eights at the 1988 World Junior Rowing Championships, a silver medal in coxless fours at the 1990 World Rowing Championships, a silver medal in eights at the 1990 World Rowing Championships, and a bronze medal in coxless fours at the 1992 World Rowing Championships.

References

1970 births
Living people
French male rowers
World Rowing Championships medalists for France
Place of birth missing (living people)